Sergei Teryayev (born October 13, 1994) is a Russian professional ice hockey defenceman. He is currently playing with Sokol Krasnoyarsk of the Supreme Hockey League (VHL), the second-tier league in Russia.

Teryayev made his Kontinental Hockey League debut playing with Amur Khabarovsk during the 2013–14 season. During the 2015–16 season, Teryayev was traded by Amur to fellow KHL club, Salavat Yulaev Ufa on December 1, 2015. He was immediately re-assigned to affiliate, Toros Neftekamsk of the VHL.

References

External links

1994 births
Living people
Amur Khabarovsk players
People from Kurgan, Kurgan Oblast
Russian ice hockey defencemen
Sokol Krasnoyarsk players
Toros Neftekamsk players
Sportspeople from Kurgan Oblast